Priestfield tram stop is a tram stop in Priestfield, Wolverhampton, England. It opened on 31 May 1999 and has Park and ride facilities. It is situated on Midland Metro Line 1.

It is situated near to the old site of Priestfield railway station, which closed in 1972. It is the last stop on the former railway section of line 1, before it switches to the street-running section, a short distance north of the stop.

Services
Mondays to Fridays, Midland Metro services in each direction between Birmingham and Wolverhampton run at six to eight-minute intervals during the day, and at fifteen-minute intervals during the evenings and on Sundays. They run at eight minute intervals on Saturdays.

References

 Article on this Metro stop from Rail Around Birmingham & the West Midlands

Transport in Wolverhampton
West Midlands Metro stops
Railway stations in Great Britain opened in 1999